In graph theory, Vizing's theorem states that every simple undirected graph may be edge colored using a number of colors that is at most one larger than the maximum degree  of the graph.
At least  colors are always necessary, so the undirected graphs may be partitioned into two classes: "class one" graphs for which  colors suffice, and "class two" graphs for which  colors are necessary.
A more general version of Vizing's theorem states that every undirected multigraph without loops can be colored with at most  colors, where  is the multiplicity of the multigraph.
The theorem is named for Vadim G. Vizing who published it in 1964.

Discovery
The theorem discovered by Russian mathematician Vadim G. Vizing was published in 1964 when Vizing was working in Novosibirsk and became known as Vizing's theorem.
 Indian mathematician R. P. Gupta independently discovered the theorem, while undertaking his doctorate (1965-1967).

Examples
When , the graph  must itself be a matching, with no two edges adjacent, and its edge chromatic number is one.

When , the graph  must be a disjoint union of paths and cycles. If all cycles are even, they can be 2-edge-colored by alternating the two colors around each cycle. However, if there exists at least one odd cycle, then no 2-edge-coloring is possible.

Proof

Let  be a simple undirected graph. If the graph is empty, the theorem trivially holds. Let  and suppose a proper -edge-coloring exists for all  where .

Suppose that no proper -edge-coloring of  exists. This is equivalent to this statement:

The other way around, if a proper -edge-coloring exists, then we can delete , restrict the coloring and (1) won't hold either.

We define colorings  as
 for all ,
 not defined,
 otherwise.

From the definition of  this holds: 

The edge leading to  clearly has color . Which is a contradiction with (1) above.

Classification of graphs
Several authors have provided additional conditions that classify some graphs as being of class one or class two, but do not provide a complete classification. For instance, if the vertices of the maximum degree  in a graph  form an independent set, or more generally if the induced subgraph for this set of vertices is a forest, then  must be of class one.

 showed that almost all graphs are of class one. That is, in the Erdős–Rényi model of random graphs, in which all -vertex graphs are equally likely, let  be the probability that an -vertex graph drawn from this distribution is of class one; then  approaches one in the limit as  goes to infinity. For more precise bounds on the rate at which  converges to one, see .

Planar graphs
 showed that a planar graph is of class one if its maximum degree is at least eight.
In contrast, he observed that for any maximum degree in the range from two to five, there exist
planar graphs of class two.  For degree two, any odd cycle is such a graph, and for degree three, four, and five, these graphs can be constructed from platonic solids by replacing a single edge by a path of two adjacent edges.

In Vizing's planar graph conjecture,  states that all simple, planar graphs with maximum degree six or seven are of class one, closing the remaining possible cases.
Independently,  and  partially proved Vizing's planar graph conjecture by showing that all planar graphs with maximum degree seven are of class one.
Thus, the only case of the conjecture that remains unsolved is that of maximum degree six. This conjecture has implications for the total coloring conjecture.

The planar graphs of class two constructed by subdivision of the platonic solids are not regular: they have vertices of degree two as well as vertices of higher degree.
The four color theorem (proved by ) on vertex coloring of planar graphs, is equivalent to the statement that every bridgeless 3-regular planar graph is of class one .

Graphs on nonplanar surfaces
In 1969, Branko Grünbaum conjectured that every 3-regular graph with a polyhedral embedding on any two-dimensional oriented manifold such as a torus must be of class one. In this context, a polyhedral embedding is a graph embedding such that every face of the embedding is topologically a disk and such that the dual graph of the embedding is simple, with no self-loops or multiple adjacencies. If true, this would be a generalization of the four color theorem, which was shown by Tait to be equivalent to the statement that  3-regular graphs with a polyhedral embedding on a sphere are of class one. However,  showed the conjecture to be false by finding snarks that have polyhedral embeddings on high-genus orientable surfaces. Based on this construction, he also showed that it is NP-complete to tell whether a polyhedrally embedded graph is of class one.

Algorithms

 describe a polynomial time algorithm for coloring the edges of any graph with  colors, where  is the maximum degree of the graph. That is, the algorithm uses the optimal number of colors for graphs of class two, and uses at most one more color than necessary for all graphs. Their algorithm follows the same strategy as Vizing's original proof of his theorem: it starts with an uncolored graph, and then repeatedly finds a way of recoloring the graph in order to increase the number of colored edges by one.

More specifically, suppose that  is an uncolored edge in a partially colored graph. There are two cases:
This leads to a new coloring that includes edge .

In an unpublished technical report,  claimed a faster  time bound for the same problem of coloring with   colors.

History
Although Vizing's theorem is now standard material in many graph theory textbooks, Vizing had trouble publishing the result initially, and his paper on it appears in an obscure journal, Diskret. Analiz.

See also
Brooks' theorem relating vertex colorings to maximum degree

Notes

References
.
.
.
.
.
.
.
.
.
.
.
.
.
.
.
. (In Russian.)
.

External links
 Proof of Vizing's theorem at PlanetMath.

Graph coloring
Theorems in graph theory